Ranald Bane MacDonald (dates of birth and death unknown, alive in 1431) was the second son of John Mór Tanister (died 1427) and a daughter of Finnon (the Green Abbot) or by his wife Margery Byset (married in 1399). He is the founder of Clan MacDonald of Largie. He was given a charter for lands in Kintyre around Largie, for his services at the battle of Inverlochy.

Family
He is known to have fathered: 
Donald MacDonald, 2nd of Largie 
Alexander MacDonald, 3rd of Largie
John MacDonald
Marion of Cortynvale

Notes

References

Clan MacDonald of Largie